The Bundeswehr Cross of Honour for Valour is the highest military decoration of the Bundeswehr.  It is the highest class of the Bundeswehr Cross of Honour.  The decoration is the first combat valour award presented by Germany since World War II.

History
Since World War II, Germany has seen its military as a defensive force, but during the 1990s Germany began playing a bigger role with its military within the European Union.  After the September 11 attacks on the United States, Germany joined ISAF in Afghanistan and has continued to deploy Bundeswehr troops to areas under combat conditions.

In 2007, the Petitions Committee of the Bundestag made a recommendation to create a decoration to recognize military personnel for valour.  In 2008, Ernst-Reinhard Beck, the president of the German Reservists Association, suggested the reestablishment of the Iron Cross.  From its establishment by the Kingdom of Prussia in 1813 until 1945, the Iron Cross had recognized valour by German soldiers.  However, the historical connotations assigned to the Iron Cross from World War II provoked criticism from some groups.  Federal Defence Minister Franz Josef Jung proposed a new level of the Bundeswehr Cross of Honour to recognize bravery and valour in combat on 13 August 2008.  The President of Germany Horst Köhler granted authorization for this valour decoration on 18 September 2008.  On 10 October 2008, the directive creating the Bundeswehr Cross of Honour for Valour became law upon being published in the Federal Law Gazette and the Federal Gazette.

The first recipients of the Cross of Honour for Valour were four soldiers caught up in a suicide attack by Taliban forces on 20 October 2008 southwest of Kunduz, Afghanistan.  Two German soldiers were wounded and two were killed in the attack.  Five Afghan children died, while one was injured.  Disregarding the fact that their armored vehicle was on fire and munitions were exploding around them, these four soldiers rushed to the scene to try to help the wounded without regard for their own safety.

Criteria
Members of the German Armed forces are statutorily, under Section 7 of the Legal Status of Military Personnel Act, required to be brave.  Members swear to "bravely defend the rights and freedom of the German people."  For this reason any conduct recognized by the Cross of Honour for Valour must be of an exceptionally brave nature.  Recommendations must describe in great detail how this bravery is above that which is required and how it was "necessary to overcome fear and perform an act of gallantry in the face of exceptional danger to life and limb whilst demonstrating staying power and serenity in order to fulfill the military mission in an ethically sound way."

Recipients

References

Military awards and decorations of Germany (Bundeswehr)
Courage awards